Gnonsiane Niombla (born 9 July 1990) is a French female handball player for Paris 92 and the French national team.

On 1 December 2016, Niombla was awarded the rank of Chevalier (knight) of the French National Order of Merit.

Honours
Olympic Games:
Silver Medalist: 2016
World Championship:
Gold Medalist: 2017
European Championship:
Bronze Medalist: 2016
European Youth Championship:
Winner: 2007
Romanian Championship:
Winner: 2017, 2018
Romanian Cup:
Winner: 2017, 2018
Romanian Supercup:
Winner: 2016, 2017
French Championship:
Winner: 2015
Silver Medalist: 2013
French Cup:
Winner: 2014
French League Cup:
Winner: 2015, 2016
Finalist: 2014
EHF Cup Winners' Cup:
Finalist: 2015
EHF Champions League:
Bronze Medalist: 2017, 2018

References

External links

French female handball players
1990 births
Living people
People from Villeurbanne
Expatriate handball players
French expatriate sportspeople in Hungary
French expatriate sportspeople in Romania
French sportspeople of Ivorian descent
Olympic handball players of France
Olympic medalists in handball
Olympic silver medalists for France
Medalists at the 2016 Summer Olympics
Handball players at the 2016 Summer Olympics
European champions for France
Siófok KC players
Sportspeople from Lyon Metropolis